Tasam is a Tibetan term which refers to a nomadic caravan house which is not only used for living in but is used for the exchange of commodities and bargaining in markets in Tibet.

References
Heinrich Harrer. Seven Years in Tibet. Penguin Group (USA) Incorporated, Sep 29, 1997 pg. 48

Tibet